Tubualá Airport  is an airport serving the island town of Tubualá, in the Guna Yala Province of Panama.

Approaches to either end of the runway are over the water.

See also

Transport in Panama
List of airports in Panama

References

External links
OpenStreetMap - Tubualá Airport

 Google Earth

Airports in Panama
Guna Yala